Miles Aldridge (born 29 September 1964) is a British fashion photographer and artist.

Early life
Born in North London to graphic designer Alan Aldridge, Miles grew up accustomed to celebrity – John Lennon was a family friend, as well as Eric Clapton and Elton John. When he was a child, he posed with his father for Lord Snowdon. At the age of 12, Alan Aldridge moved to Los Angeles where he formed a new family. Miles stayed in London with his mother Rita, a housewife, and his half brother Marc Aldridge and sister Saffron Aldridge. His two half-sisters Lily Aldridge and Ruby Aldridge are also models. He studied illustration at the Central St Martins to follow his father's steps and afterwards briefly directed pop videos (for bands including The Verve, The Charlatans and Catherine Wheel).

He moved into photography by chance: he sent some photos of an aspiring model girlfriend to an agency and fell into fashion when British Vogue called him as well as her. By then he had hung out on shoots with his sister and travelled to New York in the mid-nineties, where he started working almost immediately.

Career
Initially Aldridge shot covers of the American monthly fashion magazine W, then he worked for Numéro, Teen Vogue, Vogue Nippon, The New York Times Magazine, GQ, The New Yorker, The Face, Paradis and Harper's Bazaar. For many years he has been an important contributor for Vogue Italia, building a solid friendship with Franca Sozzani.

Aldridge worked as an advertising photographer for Longchamp, MAC Cosmetics, Sergio Rossi, Carolina Herrera, Lavazza and Mercedes E-Class, among the others. He shot for noted fashion designers such as Karl Lagerfeld, Giorgio Armani, Yves Saint Laurent and Paul Smith.

Exhibitions
Many private and public art galleries have hosted Aldridge's photographs around the world: in 2007 the Miami Beach Art Photo Expo; in 2006 and in 2008 the Galerie Alex Daniels in Amsterdam with solo shows The Cabinet and Acid Candy; in 2010 the Contributed Studio for the Arts in Berlin and the Gallery Hotel Art in Florence.

In 2009 Steven Kasher Gallery displayed Pictures for Photographs, his first solo show in the United States. The exhibition and a monographic volume were the peak of a project combining drawings and photographs, born from a collaboration with Karl Lagerfeld and Gerhard Steidl. In New York his work was showcased also at the International Center of Photography with am exhibition entitled Weird Beauty.

In the Summer of 2013, Somerset House in London hosted a major retrospective exhibition of the photographer entitled I Only Want You to Love Me, which brings together large scale photographic prints of works produced during his career.

Aldridge's photographs appear also in the permanent collection of the National Portrait Gallery, London (with two portraits of Jarvis Cocker and Lily Cole), the Victoria and Albert Museum. and The British Museum.

Selected solo exhibitions
 2019: Miles Aldridge; Screenprints, Polaroids and Drawings, Christophe Guye Galerie, Zurich, Switzerland
 2018: Miles Aldridge Art History, Reflex Gallery, Amsterdam, Netherlands
 2017: Miles Aldridge (after), Lyndsey Ingram, London, Great Britain
 2016: Please return Polaroid, Steven Kasher Gallery, New York, United States
 2016: Please return Polaroid, Lyndsey Ingram, London, Great Britain
 2015: The Pure Wonder, Fahey/Klein Gallery, Los Angeles, United States
 2015: A Dazzling Beauty, OCA, São Paulo, Brazil
 2014: Miles Aldridge: The Age of Pleasure, Christophe Guye Galerie, Zurich, Switzerland
 2014: One Black & White and Twenty Four Colour Photographs, Reflex Gallery, Amsterdam, Netherlands
 2014: Miles Aldridge's Carousel: Lithograph and Screenprints, Drawings and Photographs, Sims Reed Gallery, London, Great Britain
 2013: Miles Aldridge: I Only Want You to Love Me, Steven Kasher Gallery, New York, United States
 2013: Retrospective: I Only Want You to Love Me, Somerset House, London, Great Britain
 2013: Short Breaths, Brancolini Grimaldi, London, Great Britain 
 2013: Carousel, Brancolini Grimaldi, London, Great Britain
 2011: Ein Bild von einem Auto, Galerie der Stadt Sindelfingen, Sindelfingen, Germany
 2010: 13 Women, Contributed – Studio for the Arts, Berlin, Germany
 2010: New Work, Brancolini Grimaldi, London, Great Britain
 2010: Kristen – As Seen by Miles Aldridge and Chantal Joffe, Galerie Alex, Amsterdam, Netherlands
 2010: Lavazza 2010, Foundation Centre of Photography/ Fundacja Centrum Fotografii, Poland
 2009: Miles Aldgridge, Colette, Paris, France
 2009: Pictures for Photographs, Steven Kasher Gallery, New York, United States
 2009: Doll Face, Hamiltons, London, Great Britain
 2008: Acid Candy, Galerie Alex, Amsterdam, Netherlands
 2007: The Cabinet, Reflex Modern Art Gallery, Amsterdam, Netherlands

Selected group exhibitions
2019: Pure 'Joy''', Western Exhibitions, Chicago, United States
2018: The Side of Paradise, Huxley Parlour Gallery, London, Great Britain
2017: Fashion & Politics in Vogue Italia, Photo Vogue Festival, Milan, Italy
2017: The Critic as Artist, Reading Museum, Reading, Great Britain
2017: Showroom, Christophe Guye Galerie, Zurich, Switzerland
2016: Fashion Show. 60 Years of Fashion Photography, Atlas Gallery, London, Great Britain
2015: Coming into Fashion: A Century of Photography at Conde Nast, Multimedia Art Museum, Moscow, Russia
2015: Coming into Fashion: A Century of Photography at Conde Nast, Norton Museum of Art, West Palm Beach, United States
2015: Sleepless - The Bed in History and Contemporary Art, 21er Haus of the Belvedere, Vienna, Austria
2014: Slaves of Mimesis: Nine Years On 23rd Street, Steven Kasher Gallery, New York, United States
2014: Aipad New York, Aipad, New York, United States
2014: The Fashion World of Jean Paul Gaultier: From the Sidewalk to the Catwalk, Barbican Art Gallery, London, Great Britain
2014: The Fashion World of Jean Paul Gaultier: From the Sidewalk to the Catwalk, The Brooklyn Museum, New York, United States
2014: Beauty of Darkness II, Reflex Gallery, Amsterdam, Netherlands
2013: Miami Project, Steven Kasher, New York, United States
2013: New Fashion Photography, Contributed Studio for the Arts, Berlin, Germany
2013: Dream Woman + Dream Men, Central Exhibition Hall 'Manage', Saint-Petersburg, Russia
2012: Icons of Tomorrow, Christophe Guye Galerie, Zurich, Switzerland
2012: Best of Fashion Photography, Contributed Studio for the Arts, Berlin, Germany
2011: Ein Bild von einem Auto, Galerie der Stadt Sindelfingen, Sindelfingen, Germany
2011: Selling Dreams: One Hundred Years of Fashion Photography, organised by the V&A, at Light House Media Centre, Wolverhampton, Great Britain 
2011: Beauty Culture, The Annenberg Space for Photography, Los Angeles, United States
2010: A Positive View, Somerset House, London, Great Britain
2009: Something for Everyone, Hamiltons Gallery, London, Great Britain
2009: Weird Beauty: Fashion Photography Now – Year of Fashion, ICP International Center of Photography, New York, United States
2008: Art Photo Expo, Art Basel, Miami Beach, United States
2008: Traum Frauen – 50 Starfotografen zeigen ihre Vision von Schönheit, Haus der Photographie / Deichtorhallen, Hamburg, Germany
2008: Something for Everyone, Hamiltons Gallery, London, Great Britain
2007: Art Photo Expo, Art Basel, Miami Beach, United States
2004: The Beauty of Darkness, Reflex Gallery, Amsterdam, Netherlands
2002: Archeology of Elegance, Haus der Photographie / Deichtorhallen, Hamburg, Germany

Monographs
His monographs include Acid Candy (published by Reflex New Art Gallery, Amsterdam, with an introduction by Glenn O'Brien); The Cabinet (with an introduction by Marilyn Manson), Pictures for Photographs  (published by Steidl) and  Other Pictures (2012, Steidl).

In 2013, Brancolini Grimaldi (London based Art Gallery in Somerset House) announced a Rizzoli special edition of Aldridge's new book I Only Want You to Love Me, limited to 200 signed and numbered copies. Aldridge's latest project is a book made in collaboration with stylist Nicola Formichetti and entitled Zero Zero Vol. 02, that will be presented during the New York Fashion Week.

Style
His influences include film directors Derek Jarman, David Lynch, Federico Fellini, Michelangelo Antonioni, the photographer Richard Avedon and the psychedelic graphic design of his father, Alan Aldridge. His work is highly controlled with a cinematic effect.

 Quotes 
 Miles sees a color coordinated, graphically pure, hard-edged reality. — David Lynch
 Miles Aldridge constructs dreams.  That is his artistic and commercial practice. He understands the essential ingredients of the dream and he uses impeccable instinct in crafting something like "stills" from the fractured narratives that we normally experience nocturnally and unconsciously...he creates these dreams while illustrating today's fashions for their potential buyers. A dream can make you conquer a new land or buy a new hat or a painting or a philosophy. Aldridge knows that dreams are an exquisite tapestry of right and wrong, a chain of happenings in which what is "right," that is what is logical or normal, conflicts with what is wrong, what defies our waking order of things, our expectations and sensibility.  Dreams disrupt what is perceived as reality.  Dreams happen to some people.  And some people make them happen. — Glenn O'Brien, from Introduction to Acid Candy Miles Aldridge is a director at heart. His images are anything but portraits of a subject. They are his actors, his actresses...Each photograph has a very sacred pathology to every angle and obsession to detail. There is genius in the very deliberate blankness on the face of the models than enables a transference of identity. He always draws you into an arrested fetish that seems as forbidden as a little girl's diary. — Marilyn Manson, from Introduction to The Cabinet In his acid-coloured images of lascivious lips, impossibly glossed models and hallucinogenic still lives, the photographer Miles Aldridge is plainly heir to some of the twentieth century's enduring pop culture visionaries. David Lynch's surreal stylisation and interest in moths, the carefully staged elegance of Richard Avedon and the psychedelic graphic design of Alan Aldridge are all in there. — Skye Sherwin, Art Review April 2009

Bibliography
 2016: (after Cattelan), Colour Pictures, London
 2016: Please return Polaroid, Steidl, Germany 
 2014: Miles of Mac, Rizzoli, New York
 2014: One Black & White and Nineteen Colour Photographs, Reflex, Amsterdam
 2014: Miles Aldridge's Carousel, Sims Reed Gallery, London
 2013: Miles Aldridge: I Only Want You To Love Me, Rizzoli International Publications 
 2013: Miles Aldridge: Other Pictures, Steidl, Germany
 2010: Kristen: As seen by Miles Aldridge and Chantal Joffe, Reflex Editions, Amsterdam 
 2009: Pictures for Photographs, Steidl, Germany
 2008: Acid Candy, Reflex Editions, Amsterdam
 2006: The Cabinet, Reflex Gallery, Amsterdam

Selected featured publications
 2016: Bling Bling Baby!, Hate Cantz Verlag GmbH, Germany 
 2015: Sleeples - The Bed in History and Contemporary Art'', 21er Haus Belvedere, Vienna

References

External links
 
 
 Miles Aldridge on Models.com
 Gallery at Christophe Guye Galerie

English music video directors
Photographers from London
Living people
1964 births